Donald Edison Hillman (August 24, 1918 – March 16, 2012) was an American World War II flying ace and prisoner of war credited with five enemy aircraft destroyed. He was also the first American pilot, in 1952, to make a deep-penetration overflight of Soviet territory for the purpose of aerial reconnaissance.

Early life
Hillman was born in Seattle, Washington on August 24, 1918. He graduated from Broadway High School, and attended the University of Washington for a short time before transferring to Virginia Military Academy. He then transferred to Stanford University, where he graduated with a business degree in 1939.

Military career
Hillman joined up in October 1940, and underwent his flight training with the Army Air Corps. In 1943, he deployed to Europe as commander of the 386th Fighter Squadron. He flew P-47 escort missions initially with the Eighth Air Force, and then in 1944 with the Ninth Air Force. Later that year he was shot down and held as a prisoner of war in Stalag Luft III. After an unsuccessful escape attempt, he was transferred to another camp, where he managed to successfully escape, aided and accompanied by a disillusioned German officer. After the war the two became good friends.

On October 15, 1952, a Boeing B-47B Stratojet piloted by then Colonel Hillman, deputy commander of the 306th Bombardment Wing, left Eielson Air Force Base in Alaska. It crossed over the Arctic ocean, turned eastwards back over Siberia, and returned to Eielson via Provideniya. It was the United States' first deep-penetration reconnaissance mission against the Soviet Union.
 
Hillman retired from the Air Force in 1962, taking up an Air Force liaison position with Boeing in Seattle. He died on March 16, 2012, aged 93.

References

External links
Secret War with Russia An interview with Col. Hillman at netnebraska.org
Lt. Col. Hillman on the cover of Life magazine, December 9, 1946

1918 births
2012 deaths
American World War II flying aces
American prisoners of war in World War II
Aviators from Washington (state)
Military personnel from Seattle
Recipients of the Air Medal
Recipients of the Distinguished Flying Cross (United States)
Recipients of the Silver Star
Recipients of the Croix de Guerre (France)
Stanford Graduate School of Business alumni
United States Air Force officers
World War II prisoners of war held by Germany